Olga Medvedeva (born 22 March 1987) is a Russian team handball player from Astrakhan, former Junior World Champion for Russia, and currently playing for the Norwegian club Larvik HK.

Club career 
With Larvik HK Medvedeva won gold medals in the Norwegian top league in 2006/2007 and in 2007/2008, and also the cup in 2006/2007.

She won the Women's EHF Cup Winners' Cup in 2008 with Larvik HK.

References

1987 births
Living people
Sportspeople from Astrakhan
Russian female handball players
Expatriate handball players
Russian expatriates in Norway